In number theory, given a positive integer n and an integer a coprime to n, the multiplicative order of a modulo n is the smallest positive integer k such that .

In other words, the multiplicative order of a modulo n is the order of a in the multiplicative group of the units in the ring of the integers modulo n.

Example 

The powers of 4 modulo 7 are as follows:

 

The smallest positive integer k such that 4k ≡ 1 (mod 7) is 3, so the order of 4 (mod 7) is 3.

Properties 

Even without knowledge that we are working in the multiplicative group of integers modulo n, we can show that a actually has an order by noting that the powers of a can only take a finite number of different values modulo n, so according to the pigeonhole principle there must be two powers, say s and t and without loss of generality s > t, such that as ≡ at (mod n). Since a and n are coprime, a has an inverse element a−1 and we can multiply both sides of the congruence with a−t, yielding as−t ≡ 1 (mod n).

The concept of multiplicative order is a special case of the order of group elements. The multiplicative order of a number a modulo n is the order of a in the multiplicative group whose elements are the residues modulo n of the numbers coprime to n, and whose group operation is multiplication modulo n. This is the group of units of the ring Zn; it has φ(n) elements, φ being Euler's totient function, and is denoted as U(n) or U(Zn).

As a consequence of Lagrange's theorem, the order of a (mod n) always divides φ(n). If the order of a is actually equal to φ(n), and therefore as large as possible, then a is called a primitive root modulo n. This means that the group U(n) is cyclic and the residue class of a generates it.

The order of a (mod n) also divides λ(n), a value of the Carmichael function, which is an even stronger statement than the divisibility of φ(n).

Programming languages
 Maxima CAS : zn_order (a, n)
 Rosetta Code - examples of multiplicative order in various languages

See also
 Discrete logarithm
 Modular arithmetic

References

External links
 

Modular arithmetic